A bell hanger is a skilled tradesperson who installs bells in turrets and towers, or mechanical or electronic bell systems in buildings or on ships.

Simple Bells

The job of bell hanging was often partnered with that of bellfounding.  In the late 18th century, George Hedderly  of Nottingham advertised that he “casts and hangs all sorts of Church bells and Turret bells… and executes all the various branches in the bell-founding and bell-hanging business expeditiously.” 
Bell hangers installed and maintained burglar alarms in private homes. In addition to guaranteeing his work for a year, Edinburgh bell hanger George Tough advised that “To prevent robbery both in town and country houses he hangs Alarm Bells at doors and windows, if required, so that it will be impossible for the most alert robber to break into a house without ringing a bell in a most furious manner, the whole family thereby instantly alarmed, and persons and properties preserved.”
A call bell to ring inside the house when pulled outside required the bell hanger to drill through brick or mortar.

Call Bells

Inside houses, the installation of mechanized call bells for servants required new skills in the bell hanger's trade. Each bell was operated by a cord or lever connected to a series of copper wires strung over and through walls and floors to a bell board in the servants’ quarters. In old British houses, the addition of a bell system could cause considerable damage to plasterwork and finished wood.

A more discreet method developed by 1844 involved sending all the wires through metal tubes embedded in plaster up to the space below the roof, where they met and went down in another tube to the ground level bell board.  No wires were visible.

A bell hanger was of necessity skilled in a variety of trades. By the time North Americans were building hotels, offices and upscale homes, most advertisements involving bell hangers had them either teamed up with locksmiths, founders and cutlers, or performing those trades themselves.  In 1835, N. Constable offered “his services to the citizens of Buffalo, and the public in general, in the capacity of Bell Hanger, Lock Maker, Cutler, Brass Founder and White Smith.”

Hardware suppliers advertised to “Carpenters, Masons, Bell Hangers and Cabinet Makers.” 

In 1849 lock manufacturer Edward Bristol offered his hardware and the services of his staff of locksmiths, bell hangers and silver platers to “Contractors and Builders of Steam Boats, Hotels, Stores and Houses.”  Increasingly, bell hangers worked at the construction stage of a building – or ship – though by the second half of the 19th century their names were found in the classified listings of city directories for the convenience of private citizens.

Bell hanging was the subject of United States patents as early as 1858.

Increasingly, bell hangers worked at the construction stage of a building though by the second half of the 19th century their names were found in the classified listings of city directories for the convenience of private citizens.  The San Francisco business directory listed only two bell hangers in 1858. In 1868 there were ten, and ten years later there were twenty-seven. In 1878 one company, Will & Finck, advertised itself as “Electric & Mechanical Bell Hangers.”  The transition away from mechanical bell systems had begun.

Shifting Associations

For decades, the trade of bell hanging was associated with other workers in metal.  Because of the similarities in their work using files, bell hangers in Great Britain were affiliated with the Amalgamated Society of Whitesmiths, Locksmiths, Bell-hangers, Domestic Engineers, Art Metal Workers and General Iron Fitters after 1891.
As new technologies were developed and used in construction, bell hangers began to classify themselves with the latest trades.  In Canada, Ottawa tradesman J.P. Murphy advertised his services as “Practical Plumber, Gas & Steam Fitter, Bell Hanger, &c.” in 1879, and in 1895 Montreal's G.R. Woodburn & Co. were “Practical Sanitarians, Plumbers, Gas and Steamfitters, Electric and Mechanical Bell Hangers, Etc.”

From Mechanical to Electric

Besides the damage and mess of installing wires for systems of mechanical bells, there were maintenance problems with them. They would break, stretch or corrode over time. Electric bell wires could go around corners and even double on themselves.  In 1895 John Trowbridge wrote, “No modern house is now provided with the mechanical bell attachments which were universal forty years ago.”

In his 1889 The Bell Hangers’ Handbook, F. B. Badt considers the transition from mechanical to electric to be complete; the book is essentially a primer for electricians.  Badt lists the tools that should be in every bell hanger’s kit, starting with “Insulating tape for insulating wire joints” and “Tags for numbering wires at the battery and switchboard.”

News articles in 1925 noted the loss of the traditional profession with headlines like “Bell Hanger is Man Minus Job in the Age of Electricity” and “Electric Doorbells And Telephones Pressing On A Vanishing Trade.”

References

Construction trades workers
Metalworking occupations